The PTRS-41 is a World War II-era semi-automatic anti-tank rifle firing the 14.5×114mm cartridge.

Design

The PTRS-41 was produced and used by the Soviet Union during World War II. In the years between the World Wars, the Soviet Union began experimenting with different types of armour-piercing anti-tank cartridges.  Finding the 12.7×108mm insufficient, they began development of what became the 14.5×114mm armour-piercing round. Rukavishnikov developed  to use this cartridge, but it was not successful because of some manufacturing issues, a sufficient number of more effective anti-tank guns in the Red Army, and high expectations about new German tank armour.

In 1941, the loss of huge amounts of anti-tank artillery created a need for a stop-gap anti-tank weapon, so famous USSR weapons designers such as Vasily Degtyaryov and Sergei Gavrilovich Simonov were tasked to design anti-tank rifles. Both were considered simpler and more suitable to wartime production than an updated Rukavishnikov rifle. Simonov used elements of a family of his 7.62x54R self-loading rifles and carbines which he continued to develop after his 1938 design lost to SVT-38 to create a scaled-up self-loading rifle.

The five-round magazine is loaded into the receiver and held under pressure by a swing magazine underneath. On firing the last round, the bolt is held open, and the magazine release catch can be operated only when the bolt is locked back. The gas-operated PTRS has a tendency to jam when dirty, and the 14.5 mm cartridge produces significant residue, blocking the gas port. The 14.5 mm armour-piercing bullet has a muzzle velocity of 1013 m/s and devastating ballistics. It can penetrate an armour plate up to 40 mm thick at a distance of 100 meters.

In 1943 Simonov used a scaled-down PTRS-41 design for the SKS, that would accommodate the new 1943-designed 7.62×39mm cartridge.

History

Along with his partner Vasily Degtyaryov, Sergei Gavrilovich Simonov helped the Soviet Union develop new weapons between the First and Second World War. During this time, Degtyaryov went on to create the PTRD-41 while Simonov created and designed its cousin rifle, the PTRS-41 in 1938. As one of Simonov's creations, the PTRS-41 was sometimes known as simply the "Simonov" on the battlefield. Although more advanced, the PTRS was harder to use and less reliable than the cheaper PTRD while yielding similar performance, so the PTRD was used more often.

The semi-automatic anti-tank rifle was used extensively on the Eastern Front in World War II. It was used successfully by Hero of the Soviet Union Sergeant Yakov Pavlov during the Battle of Stalingrad when the NCO led the defence of Pavlov's House in the city after he mounted rifles on the building's roof. Because the rifles were effective against thin armour at close range, they were able to destroy numerous German Panzers that came into range because they could shoot through the thin armour on their turret-roofs. Guns captured by the Germans were given the designation 14.5 mm PzB 784(r).

The AT gun was used again by Communist-backed forces in the Korean War and Chinese Civil War.

PTRS-41 rifles are still in use by Donbas militiamen in Ukraine, during the Russo-Ukrainian War, due to their ability to penetrate APC armour. The ammunition used is actual World War II vintage.

Users 

 
 
 
 
 
 
 
 :  Used by militiamen in 2014 and 2022.

See also
List of Russian weaponry
PTRD-41
Boys anti-tank rifle
Lahti L-39
Mauser 1918 T-Gewehr
Panzerbüchse 39
Solothurn S-18/100
Type 97 automatic cannon
Wz. 35 anti-tank rifle

References

References

External links

PTRS 14.5mm
Syria and Her HS.50s

14.5×114mm anti-materiel rifles
Semi-automatic rifles of the Soviet Union
Anti-tank rifles of the Soviet Union
Short stroke piston firearms
World War II infantry weapons of the Soviet Union
Weapons and ammunition introduced in 1941